The Nuyorican (Puerto Rican New Yorkers) Poets Cafe is a nonprofit organization in Alphabet City, on the Lower East Side of Manhattan. It is a bastion of the Nuyorican art movement in New York City, and has become a forum for poetry, music, hip hop, video, visual arts, comedy, and theater. Several events during the PEN World Voices festival are hosted at the cafe.

The Café is meant to be a shooting-off point from which Nuyorican artists, poets, and playwrights take shared themes and messages of community, understanding, and the breaking down of arbitrary separators of color, among others, and spread them outside the environment of the Café.

History

Founded , the Nuyorican Poets Cafe began operating in the East Village apartment of writer, poet, and Rutgers University professor Miguel Algarín with assistance from co-founders Miguel Piñero, Bimbo Rivas, Pedro Pietri and Lucky Cienfuegos.

By 1975, the number of poets involved with the venture outgrew that space, so Algarín rented an Irish pub, the Sunshine Café on East 6th Street, and they named it "The Nuyorican Poets Cafe". During the mid-to-late 1970s, some of the featured poets included Miguel Algarín, Miguel Piñero, Pedro Pietri, Victor Hernández Cruz, Diane Burns, Tato Laviera, Piri Thomas, Jesús Papoleto Meléndez, Sandra María Esteves, and José Angel Figueroa. By 1980, the overflow of audiences led them to purchase their current building at 236 East 3rd Street so as to expand their activities and programs. The second wave of major Nuyorican Poets, featured at the cafe, emerged, including Nancy Mercado, Giannina Braschi, and Martín Espada.

The Nuyorican Poets Cafe counts poetry activists such as Bob Holman, Carl Hancock Rux, Saul Williams, Sarah Jones, Emanuel Xavier, and Beau Sia as former slammasters and was the home to the now mobile Nuyorican freestyle battle program Braggin' Rites.

In explaining the philosophy of the venture, co-founder Algarín said: "We must listen to one another. We must respect one another's habits and we must share the truth and the integrity that the voice of the poet so generously provides."

In the 1990s a new group of Nuyorican poets and performing artists emerged to read at the cafe. In 2008, Daniel Gallant was appointed executive director.

In 2015, Carmen was the first full-length opera shown at the cafe, produced by IconoClassic Opera.

The Open Room 
The Open Room idea was the basis of the Cafe at its beginning. It was a space for poets and other kinds of artists to present their work to an audience. It has become a weekly event since at the Cafe, attracting all kinds of poets who sign up on a first come, first go basis.

At some point in its early history, a Nuyorican chant emerged to precede the Open Room slam performances as a transition from the intense dancing present at the Cafe into a more quiet listening experience.

The Open Room typifies the Cafe, its open-to-all attitude and accepting environment. Anyone can perform and the entirety of the Cafe is meant to listen.

Nuyorican Poetry and Plays at the Café 
Puerto Rican New York poets, precursing the Café itself (1964-1974), were heavily involved in political conversation and the poetry coming from these individuals leading up to the founding of the Café dealt with capturing their own overlooked history. It broke poetic convention and centered upon examining the concepts of identity and representation.

From 1982 to 1989, the Café was shut down but Nuyorican poetry continued through this time to become part of the foundation of a newly forming literary canon. This canon was that of Latin people in the United States. Publication increased both in the United States and Puerto Rico, and this poetry was studied as exemplary of multiculturalism's emerging effects on the formation of literary canons at a time when the question of multiculturalism was a preoccupation.

Nuyorican poetry and plays are both considered a part of the cultural and intellectual Nuyorican movement. The Café was and is a place designed for the active performance of this poetry and these plays. Performance and active audience engagement with the work presented were important to the Café and its environment. The Café itself played large part in solidifying the Nuyorican movement and the performance element it emphasized reveals themes of visibility and voice. Before and while serving as co-director of the Café, Bob Holman heavily advocated for poetry slam nights at the Nuyorican. He wanted the Café to be a community-oriented space and his own experience with slam poetry as oral, active, engaging, and connecting influenced this choice. Founder, Miguel Algarín, agreed to the suggestion. Slam poetry nights at the Nuyorican drew in large crowds and press soon followed. The Café and the Nuyorican movement works coming out of it began to reach a whole new audience.

The works of Nuyorican poetry and plays coming from the Nuyorican Poets Café throughout its decades share themes, meanings, messages, and motifs. The historical context and social parameters around these have changed throughout the years but they've stayed essentially the same. These include questions of identity and belonging, tolerance and understanding, and visibility and representation. In a book collection of plays, those coming out of the Nuyorican Poets Café Theater Festival, edited by Algarín, he groups certain plays together. Algarín’s editorial categories include themes of inner city tragedy and politics, gender plays, and hip hop and rap. These are big, essential themes also present in the larger Nuyorican movement.

Algarín also co-edited a similar book collection focused on Nuyorican poetry coming out of the Café. This collection is broken down into time periods. It tracks the thematic changes of Nuyorican works specifically in the 1990s and early 2000s. Nuyorican poetry of the 1990s era was focused on breaking down political, social, cultural, and racial boundaries between individuals and groups in the United States. The early 2000s for Nuyorican poetry was the time period when slam poetry took full root and the living, accessible nature of poetry was solidified.

In popular culture

In 1994, Nuyorican Poets Cafe was the subject of a fourteen-minute documentary entitled Nuyorican Poets Cafe. Directed, produced, and edited by Ray Santisteban, the documentary features founder Miguel Algarín, along with Willie Perdomo, Ed Morales, Pedro Pietri, and Carmen Bardeguez Brown. Nuyorican Poets Cafe won "Best Documentary" at the 1995 New Latino Filmmaker's Festival in Los Angeles.

Also in 1994, founder, Miguel Algarín, and poet and eventual co-director of the Café, Bob Holman, worked together to edit a collection of poetry originating from the Café. In this collection of Nuyorican poetry, Algarín makes a point that the main purpose of the Café and the poetry it has produced is to show poetry as the living art form it is, in his opinion, and understanding. It tracks the poetry coming out of the Café through the 1990s and early 2000s.

In 1996, the Nuyorican Poets Cafe Poetry Slam Team was the subject of a feature-length documentary entitled SlamNation. Directed by Paul Devlin, the documentary follows Nuyorican poetry slam founder Bob Holman and the poets of the 1996 Nuyorican team (Saul Williams, Beau Sia, Jessica Care Moore and muMs da Schemer) as they compete in the 1996 National Poetry Slam held in Portland, Oregon. The documentary also features performances by Marc Smith, Taylor Mali, and Patricia Smith among others.

In 1997, another collection was published. This one centered around more performance pieces: plays and monologues emerging from the Nuyorican Poets Café Theater Festival. This collection is organized to emphasis a few certain shared themes that define some part of the Nuyorican movement.

The 1998 Spanglish novel Yo-Yo Boing! by Giannina Braschi features a dramatic scene of a Spanglish poetry reading at the Nuyorican Poets Café with founder Pedro Pietri who is also a character in the play United States of Banana.

León Ichaso's 2001 film Piñero features reenacted scenes of poetry readings by Miguel Piñero of “Seeking the Cause” and “A Lower East Side Poem”; at the end of the film, co-founders of the Nuyorican Poets Cafe and other prominent poets, including Miguel Algarín, Amiri Baraka, José-Angel Figueroa, and Pedro Pietri, lead a funeral procession and scatter Piñero's ashes on the streets of the Lower East Side.

In 2018, a year after Hurricane Maria devastated Puerto Rico, PBS NewsHour featured a special on the diaspora reading at the Nuyorican Poets Café, entitled "After Hurricane Maria, Puerto Rican poets ask again what it means to belong".

List of poets, artists, and musicians

Spoken word 
Major voices in Nuyorican, Latino poetry, and other American contemporary poetry movements have performed at the Nuyorican Poets Cafe, including:

 Miguel Algarín, Founder
 Paul Beatty
 Amiri Baraka
 Giannina Braschi
 Malkia Cyril 
 Cheryl B and Daniel Dumile
 Sandra María Esteves
 Shaggy Flores
 Tonya Ingram
 La Bruja/Caridad de la Luz 
 Tato Laviera
 Jesús Papoleto Meléndez
 Nancy Mercado
 Willie Perdomo
 Pedro Pietri
 Miguel Piñero
 Ishmael Reed
Carl Hancock Rux
 Ntozake Shange
 Edwin Torres
 Emanuel Xavier

Music 
In June 2002, Nuevo Flamenco guitarists Val Ramos opened for three-time Puerto Rican Grammy nominee Danny Rivera at the Nuyorican Poets Cafe. The club also produces Latin Jazz, Reggaeton, Hip Hop, and Salsa events. Performers have included:

 Zoraida Santiago
 The Bronx Conexión
 Val Ramos
 Danny Rivera

After a brief hiatus from music, MF Doom began performing open mic events at the Nuyorican under his new moniker.

Visual arts 
The Nuyorican Poets Cafe produces exhibitions by local Latino artists, including:

 Juan Sanchez
 Rafael Tufino Jr.
 Esperanza Cortez
 Manuel Rivera-Ortiz

See also
 Nuyorican
 Nuyorican movement
 Puerto Rican literature
 Puerto Rican poetry
 Puerto Ricans in New York City

References

Further reading

External links

Nuyorican Poets Cafe at Google Cultural Institute
Verbs on Asphalt: The History of Nuyorican Poetry Slam
December 6, 2018 New York Times article: "The Early Days of the Nuyorican Poets Cafe" by Concepción de León

20th-century American literature
Alphabet City, Manhattan
Cultural history of New York City
East Village, Manhattan
Hispanic and Latino American culture in New York City
Hispanic and Latino organizations
Latin American literature
Nightclubs in Manhattan
Performance art in New York City
Poetry organizations
Puerto Rican culture in New York City
Slam poetry